The 2016 Cincinnati Bearcats baseball team represents the University of Cincinnati during the 2016 NCAA Division I baseball season. The Bearcats play their home games at Marge Schott Stadium as a member of the American Athletic Conference. They are led by head coach Ty Neal, in his third season at Cincinnati.  the 2015 UC Baseball team was the youngest team in the nation last season and will be competing for that title again in 2016. The team features 29 underclassmen (14 freshmen, two redshirt freshmen, 12 sophomores and one redshirt sophomore) to just six upperclassmen (two juniors, one redshirt junior and three seniors).

On March 21, 2016 Cincinnati defeated Northwestern 10–3 for the 8th straight win, also the 200th win at Marge Schott Stadium.  The 8–0 record at home is the best start for any UC team at home since going a perfect 10–0 at home in 1961. Cincinnati finished the home schedule with an 18–7 record, the best winning percentage in the history of Marge Schott Stadium

Previous season
In 2015, the Bearcats finished 8th in the American with a record of 15-41, 6–18 in conference play. They failed to qualify for the 2015 NCAA Division I baseball tournament. Ian Happ was drafted ninth overall by the Chicago Cubs. Happ was named first team American Baseball Coaches Association (ABCA), he was previously named First Team All-America by D1Baseball.com and was added to the second team by Baseball America, the NCBWA, Louisville Slugger Collegiate Baseball and College Sports Madness. He also was named a First Team Capital One Academic All-American by CoSIDA, along with AAC Player of the year

Roster

Schedule

Rankings from Collegiate Baseball; parenthesis indicate tournament seedings.

References

Cincinnati
Cincinnati Bearcats baseball seasons
Cincinnati baseball